Ethylnorepinephrine (Etanor, Bronkephrine, Butanefrine) is a sympathomimetic and bronchodilator related to norepinephrine. It activates both α and β adrenergic receptors.

See also 
 Norepinephrine

References 

Alpha-1 adrenergic receptor agonists
Alpha-2 adrenergic receptor agonists
Beta-adrenergic agonists
Bronchodilators
Catecholamines
Norepinephrine releasing agents
Phenylethanolamines
Sympathomimetics